Cynthia Lord is an American children's author.  Her debut novel Rules was published by Scholastic, Inc. in 2006, and was a 2007 Newbery Honor book and winner of the Schneider Family Book Award.

Early life
Lord was born in Massachusetts and grew up in New Hampshire.

In college, Lord had some short stories published, and won a contest with one.

Career

Lord lives with her husband and their two children, one of whom has autism, in Brunswick, Maine.

Awards
 2007 Newbery Honor Book
 Schneider Family Book Award

Works

Novels
 Rules, Scholastic, 2007,  
 Touch Blue, Scholastic, 2010.   
 Half A Chance, Scholastic, 2014.  
 A Handful of Stars, Scholastic, 2015.   
Because of the Rabbit, Scholastic, 2019.

Hot Rod Hamster early reader books
 Hot Rod Hamster, Scholastic, 2010.   
 Happy Birthday Hamster, Scholastic, 2011.  
 Monster Truck Mania, Scholastic, 2014.  
 Hot Rod Hamster and the Wacky Whatever Race, Scholastic, 2014.  
 Hod Rod Hamster and the Halloween Party, Scholastic, 2015.

Shelter Pet Squad series
 Jelly Bean, Scholastic, 2014.    
 Merlin, Scholastic, 2015.  
 Paloma, Scholastic, 2016.

Picture book
Borrowing Bunnies: A Surprising True Tale of Fostering Rabbits, Farrar, Straus and Giroux Young Readers, 2019.

References

Interviews
Author's Talk, Megan McCarthy
Interview: Cynthia Lord, Bildungsroman, April 3, 2006  
 2008 Audio Interview of Cynthia Lord
 An Interview With Debut Author, Cynthia Lord, Debbi Michiko Florence
 Author Interview: Cynthia Lord on Rules, cynsations, March 10, 2006

External links

 
 "Rules by Cynthia Lord" at Maw Books Blog
 

American children's writers
Newbery Honor winners
Living people
Novelists from Florida
21st-century American novelists
21st-century American women writers
Writers from Brunswick, Maine
Novelists from New Hampshire
Year of birth missing (living people)
Place of birth missing (living people)
American women children's writers
American women novelists
Novelists from Maine